Kozy  is a village in the administrative district of Gmina Czarna Dąbrówka, within Bytów County, Pomeranian Voivodeship, in northern Poland.

The village has a population of 344.

Notable residents
 Gustav Bogislav von Münchow (1686–1766), Prussian general

References

Kozy